Olearia muelleri, commonly known as Mueller daisy bush, Mueller's daisy bush or Goldfields daisy, is a species of flowering plant in the family Asteraceae and is endemic to southern continental Australia. It is a compact or spreading shrub with scattered spatula-shaped to egg-shaped leaves with the narrower end towards the base, and white and yellow, daisy-like inflorescences.

Description
There is a bell-shaped involucre at the base with four to eight rows of sticky bracts. Flowering occurs from August to October and the fruit is a silky-hairy achene, the pappus with forty to fifty bristles.

Taxonomy
Mueller daisy bush was first formally described in 1853 by Otto Wilhelm Sonder, who gave it the name Eurybia muelleri in Linnaea: ein Journal für die Botanik in ihrem ganzen Umfange, oder Beiträge zur Pflanzenkunde. In 1867, George Bentham changed the name to Olearia muelleri in Flora Australiensis. The specific epithet (muelleri) honours Ferdinand von Mueller.

Distribution and habitat
Olearia muelleri grows in mallee woodlands or spinifex communities and is widespread in the south-west of Western Australia, the south of South Australia, north-western Victoria and the far south-west of New South Wales.

References

External links
Olearia muelleri images & occurrence data from Atlas of Living Australia

Taxa named by Otto Wilhelm Sonder
Taxa described in 1853
Flora of Western Australia
muelleri
Flora of South Australia
Flora of Victoria (Australia)
Flora of New South Wales